Footprints in the Sand is a studio album by American Christian and country singer Cristy Lane. It was released in August 1983 via Liberty and LS Records. It contained ten tracks. The album was a collection of Christian recordings and was Lane's second album to consist entirely of this genre. The album also spawned two charting singles, including the title track.

Background and content
Before transitioning into the Christian music market, Cristy Lane had a series of major country hits in the 1970s and 1980s. This included "Let Me Down Easy", "I Just Can't Stay Married to You" and the number one single "One Day at a Time". The latter recording was a Christian tune and its success prompted Lane to market herself more towards the genre. She issued her first gospel record in 1981 and Footprints in the Sand would soon follow. The album consisted of ten tracks of material. The title track was Lane's musical interpretation of the religious poem. It also included covers of other Christian tunes, such as "The Lord's Prayer". Original tracks were also included on the project, such as "I've Come Back (To Say I Love You One More Time)". Footprints in the Sand was recorded in April 1983 in Nashville, Tennessee. The record was produced by Lobo, Lee Stoller (Lane's husband) and James Stroud.

Release and chart performance
Footprints in the Sand was released in August 1983 on Liberty and LS Records. It was Lane's tenth studio album in her music career. The album was originally offered as a vinyl LP and a cassette It was later offered as a compact disc in 1986. A compilation record with the same title was later released but had a different track listing with different recordings. Following its original release, Footprints in the Sand peaked at number 64 on the Billboard Top Country Albums chart. It was Lane's final studio effort to chart on the Billboard survey. Two singles were also spawned from the disc. The first single issued was "I've Come Back (To Say I Love You One More Time)" in June 1983. The song peaked at number 63 on the Billboard Hot Country Songs chart. The title track was released as the second single in September 1983. The song peaked at number on the same Billboard chart and was among Lane's final charting singles.

Track listing

Vinyl and cassette versions

Compact disc version

Personnel
All credits are adapted from the liner notes of Footprints in the Sand.

Musical personnel
 Mitch Humphries – Keyboards
 Robert M. Johnson – Rhythm guitar
 Cristy Lane – Lead vocals
 Terry McMillan – Harmonica
 Kenny Mims – Electric guitar
 Larry Paxton – Bass guitar
 Willie Rainfores – Keyboards
 Brent Rowan – Acoustic guitar
 Steven Schaeffer – Bass guitar
 James Stroud – Drums
 Robert Wray – Bass guitar
 Pete Wade – Electric guitar
 Dennis Zimmerman – Electric guitar

Technical personnel
 Bill Deele – Arranger
 Tom Harding – Assistant engineer
 Lobo – Producer
 James Skipper – Arranger
 Lee Stoller – Executive producer, manager
 James Stroud – Producer

Charts

Release history

References

Footnotes

Books

 

1983 albums
Albums produced by James Stroud
Cristy Lane albums
Liberty Records albums
LS Records albums